Andreas Holm Jensen (born 7 December 1988) is a Danish footballer. He currently plays at Nyköbing FC.

References

Danish men's footballers
1988 births
Living people
Danish Superliga players
Danish 1st Division players
Danish 2nd Division players
Næstved Boldklub players
FC Helsingør players
Association football defenders